Cristina Quer Casar ('Cristina Wants to Get Married' in English) is a 2003 Brazilian film. Cine TAM, a cinema company division of the parent company of TAM Airlines, organized the presentation of the film in Medford, Massachusetts, United States in 2007.

Plot
The film stars Cristina (Denise Fraga), who uses a dating agency to find Paulo. While Cristina dates Paulo the owner of the dating agency, Chico, begins to fall in love with Cristina.

References

External links

 

Brazilian romantic comedy films
2003 films
2000s Portuguese-language films
2003 romantic comedy films